Toury is a commune in the Eure-et-Loir department in northern France. Toury station has rail connections to Orléans, Étampes and Paris.

Population

History
On 31 October 1908 Louis Blériot succeeded in making a cross-country flight, making a round trip from Toury to Artenay and back, a total distance of 28 km (17 mi). This was not the first cross-country flight by a narrow margin, since Henri Farman had flown from Bouy to Rheims, the preceding day.

See also
Communes of the Eure-et-Loir department

References

Communes of Eure-et-Loir
Orléanais